This is a list of all personnel changes for the 2020 Indian Premier League.

Pre-auction
The BCCI set the deadline of 14 November for both the trading window and the list of retained and released players.

Transfers
Kings XI Punjab's skipper Ravichandran 
Ashwin for months was rumoured to be transferred to Delhi Capitals before eventually being transferred in November. Ajinkya Rahane, Trent Boult and Mayank Markande got salary raise during pre-auction trades.    

 ↓: Player(s) was/were swapped with the player(s) mentioned in the next row(s).
 ↑: Player(s) was/were swapped with the player(s) mentioned in the previous row(s).
 REP: Players who were unsold originally in the 2019 auction but were later signed up as a replacement player.

Released players
The released players were announced on 15 November 2019. Robin Uthappa, Yuvraj Singh and Chris Lynn were the prominent names among the released players. Jaydev Unadkat, the costliest Indian player in 2019 auction, was also released.

 REP: Players who were unsold originally in the 2019 auction but were later signed up as a replacement player.

Retained players
The team retentions were announced on 15 November 2019.

 REP: Players who were unsold originally in the 2019 auction but were later signed up as a replacement player.

Summary

Auction
The auction was conducted on 19 December 2019 in Kolkata. The teams will have an additional purse balance of Rs.3 crores in addition to balance remaining of their original Rs. 85 crores. A total of 971 players including 258 overseas players have registered for the 2019 IPL Auctions, wheres a maximum of 73 positions are to be filled. 
Later, the Governing Council sent the eight franchises the final list of players, which has been trimmed from the original 971 to 332, including 19 Indian capped players. The final list also includes 24 new players that were added after those names were requested by the franchises.

62 players, 29 overseas and 33 Indians were sold as the eight Indian Premier League franchises splurged their way into fierce bids at the auction held in Kolkata.

Australia fast bowler Pat Cummins set the cash registers ringing as he became the most expensive overseas signing in the history of the tournament after Kolkata Knight Riders acquired him for a whopping Rs.15.50 crores.

His Australian teammate, all-rounder Glenn Maxwell too earned big with the final bid being locked at Rs. 10.75 crores. The West Indian duo of Sheldon Cottrell and Shimron Hetmyer went for Rs. 8.50 crores and Rs. 7.75 crores to KXIP and Delhi Capitals respectively.

Two international captains – Aaron Finch and Eoin Morgan – also garnered huge interest as Royal Challengers Bangalore and KKR snapped them up to bolster their squads.

The young batting sensation from Mumbai, Yashasvi Jaiswal went to Rajasthan Royals for a whopping Rs. 2.4 crores while the experienced leggie, Pravin Tambe was bought by KKR.

Sold players

 ADD: Players who were not part of Original List But Added Into accelerated bidding.
 ACC: Players who were part of accelerated bidding.
 REC-1/2/3: Players unsold originally but brought back for Recall Round-1, 2 or 3.
 DI-REC-2/3: Players not called in accelerated process but were brought back for Recall Round-2  or 3.
 * : Players were in the squad for the season but did not play any match.
 0 : Players mentioned as 0 in IPL matches column were part of the squad but did not play any matches.

Withdrawn players
The following players withdrew from the tournament either due to injuries or because of other reasons.

Support staff changes

References

External links

Indian Premier League personnel changes
2020 Indian Premier League